The Romito cave is a natural limestone cave in the Lao Valley of Pollino National Park, near the town of Papasidero in Calabria, Italy. Stratigraphic record of the first excavation confirmed prolonged paleo-human occupation during the Upper Paleolithic since 17,000 years ago and the Neolithic since 6,400 years ago. A single, but exquisite piece of Upper Paleolithic parietal rock engraving was documented. Several burial sites of varying age were initially discovered. Irregularly recurring sessions have led to additional finds, which suggests future excavation work. Notable is the amount of accumulated data that has revealed deeper understanding of prehistoric daily life, the remarkable quality of the rock carvings and the burial named Romito 2, who exhibits features of pathological skeletal conditions (dwarfism).

Site 
The Grotta del Romito was discovered by Agostino Miglio, then director of the Town Museum in Castrovillari in spring of 1961, who had received curious information from several local people. Excavations started in the summer of 1962 under the direction of Paolo Graziosi of the University of Florence. The Archaeological Park contains a small museum, that presents the documentation and ongoing research.

The interior is graced with a number of curiously shaped speleothems and prehistoric graffiti.

Stratigraphy 

Excavations in an enlarged trench performed in 2000, 2002, 2003 and 2007 exposed a long sequence of strata, that forms seven main archaeological units (A–N) with episodes of intensive human occupation. The succession ranges from the Middle and Late Gravettian (units L-I-H-G) to the Early Epigravettian (unit F), Middle Epigravettian (lower unit E) and Late Epigravettian (upper unit E and units D-C-B). These cultural stages occurred between 26,000 and 10,000 years ago.

Deposits of human occupation contain numerous bones and stone tools, rounded out of size-exogenous pebbles and abundant charcoal detritus which is related to fireplaces. About fifty discovered pottery shards are evidence for occupation of the cave during the Neolithic/Iron Age transition.

Rock engravings 

The stylistic scope is characteristic of the Mediterranean and the design of perfect proportions. The feeling of force transmitted from the overall design of the figure and the careful handling of the anatomical details amounts to highest expression of Paleolithic realism in the region. In front of the rock another bovine figure has been cut, much more subtly, showing only the chest, head and part of the back. On the opposite end of the shelter sits another engraved boulder, covered with numerous linear signs. Both engraving are dated to between 14,000 and 12,000 BP.

Obsidian tools 
The presence of large quantities of obsidian in a Neolithic layer suggests that the site was an intermediate base for the obsidian trade - that originated in the Aeolian Islands in the Tyrrhenian Sea to be transferred to the Adriatic Sea.

Burials 

During the first excavations three graves were found, 9,200 years old and each containing a couple of human beings, placed in epipaleolithic layers. One grave was found inside the cave, the other two underneath the adjacent rock shelter near the bull-engraved stone.

P. Graziosi discovered the diminutive remains of Romito 2 that turned out to be the earliest known case of dwarfism in the human skeletal record. The specimen, known as Romito 2, exhibits features typical of acromesomelic dysplasia. Romito 2 was characterized by unusually short forearms and lower legs, resulting in a rather short stature. Abnormal cartilage and bone development also affected other bones of the body, particularly those of the hands and feet. There was likely a limited extension of the elbows and arms and progressively abnormal curvature of the spine.

Besides providing evidence for a greater antiquity of dwarfism than previously known, the fact that this individual reached late adolescence attests to tolerance of Upper Paleolithic groups for severely abnormal individuals and their ability to support members who were of limited economic value to the social group.

To date, nine intact, well preserved burials have been recovered from stratigraphic layers dating from ca. 18,000 to 11,000 BP, the majority of burials corresponding to a period of climatic amelioration from ca. 15,000 to 13,000 cal BP (Final Epigravettian).

Footnotes

References

External links 
Pollino Park info

Archaeology of Italy
Prehistoric sites in Italy
Caves of Italy